Dashtlu (also Romanized as Dashtlū and Dasht Lū) is a village in Golestan Rural District, in the Central District of Falavarjan County, Isfahan Province, Iran. At the 2006 census, its population was 838, in 223 families.

References 

Populated places in Falavarjan County